The murder of Francisco Laurella, Fernando Pastor Sr., and Fernando Pastor Jr. in Cabarroguis, Quirino on February 8, 1986, were three of numerous violent incidents associated with the Philippines' snap presidential elections of 1986. Quirino province assemblyman Orlando Dulay, who was the provincial coordinator of the Ferdinand Marcos' political party, the Kilusang Bagong Lipunan (KBL) was caught and found guilty of the murders in 1990.

On February 6, 1986 – the eve of the snap presidential elections – Fernando Pastor Sr., his oldest son Fernando Pastor Jr. and colleague Francisco Laurella were walking on their way home when they were abducted by Dulay and two of his men. 

The three were taken to Dulay’s residence in Cabarroguis, Quirino, and kept inside a van for three days. The tortured and mutilated bodies of the younger Pastor and Francisco Laurella were found near a ravine three days later, and that of the elder Pastor five days after. 

Dulay was eventually caught and charged in 1990, and was sentenced to life imprisonment by the Quezon City regional trial court.

Today, Laurella and Pastor Sr.'s names are engraved on Bantayog ng mga Bayani's Wall of Remembrance, which honors martyrs and heroes who fought against the Marcos dictatorship.

See also 
 Martial law under Ferdinand Marcos
 List of torture methods used by the Marcos dictatorship
 Kilusang Bagong Lipunan
 1986 Philippine presidential election

References 

Northern Luzon during martial law under Ferdinand Marcos
1986 in the Philippines
1986 murders in Asia
Deaths by person in the Philippines

Individuals honored at the Bantayog ng mga Bayani